Laëtitia Françoise Andrée "Toto" Tonazzi (born 31 January 1981 in Créteil) is a former French footballer who played for Montpellier of the Division 1 Féminine. She played as a striker and was a member of the France women's national football team. She is known for her impressive strike rate for her club and country. During the 2007–08 season, Tonazzi scored a career-high 27 goals, which included scoring five on the final match day against the women's section of Évreux FC, formerly Évreux AC.

Career
Tonazzi began her career at age 14 playing for VGA Saint-Maur. Saint-Maur had been a dominating force in French women's football during the late 1980s winning six league titles in between the years 1983 and 1990. In 2001, Tonazzi joined FCF Juvisy, who had taken over Saint-Maur as the most dominant French club by winning four of the ten titles awarded during the 90s. However, Juvisy lost control of the league heading into the new millennium with Toulouse taking over as the force. In Tonazzi's debut season with Juvisy (2001–02), she scored 14 goals. Her emerging talent led to her making her international debut for France. The following five years at Juvisy saw Tonazzi become an established international. She scored 68 league goals during the span and also helped Juvisy win two league titles (2002–03 and 2005–06), as well as a Challenge de France title in 2005.

During the 2007–08 season, Tonazzi scored a league high 27 goals in just 22 matches. She scored a career-high five goals on the final match day of the season against Évreux. The following season saw a decrease in goals as Tonazzi only appeared in 12 matches, however she contributed 15 goals. Juvisy finished in 3rd position, one point shy of qualifying for the newly created UEFA Women's Champions League.

Club statistics
Updated 7 July 2015

International career
Tonazzi made her international debut on 20 April 2002 in a 4–1 victory over the Czech Republic. Due to her amazing form domestically, she was selected to play at the 2003 FIFA Women's World Cup, where France suffered elimination in the group stage. She was among the leading goalscorers for her nation during the qualifying process for UEFA Women's Euro 2005 netting five. However, she would not be selected to play in the tournament. She made her return to major international play after she was selected by Bruno Bini to play in UEFA Women's Euro 2009. However, she did not make an appearance.

References

External links
 
 
 
 
 France player profile 
 Profile at Montpellier HSC 
 Player French football stats at footofeminin.fr 

1981 births
Living people
French women's footballers
Sportspeople from Créteil
Paris FC (women) players
Olympique Lyonnais Féminin players
Montpellier HSC (women) players
France women's international footballers
2003 FIFA Women's World Cup players
Women's association football forwards
French people of Italian descent
Division 1 Féminine players
Footballers from Val-de-Marne